Elena Scarpellini (born 14 January 1987 in Bergamo) is an Italian pole vaulter. Her best result at international senior level was ninth place at the 2010 IAAF World Indoor Championships. In the season 2018-2019 she also competed as skeleton racer.

Biography
Like many other pole vaulters, Scarpellini has a background in artistic gymnastics. She has six caps in national team, beginning from 2005. She is a four-time winner at the Italian championships.

She had her best year in 2010: in addition to breaking the national indoor record, she was fourth at the 2010 European Team Championships.

National records
 Pole vault indoor: 4.40 m (6 February 2010) - holder until 6 February 2010.

Personal bests
 Pole vault outdoor: 4.36 m (2012)
 Pole vault indoor: 4.40 m (2010)

Achievements

National titles
Italian Athletics Championships: 2010
Italian Athletics Indoor Championships: 2007, 2008, 2010

See also
Italian all-time lists - Pole vault

References

External links
 
 Elena Scarpellini at The-Sports.org

1987 births
Living people
Sportspeople from Bergamo
Italian female pole vaulters
Athletics competitors of Centro Sportivo Aeronautica Militare
Italian female skeleton racers
Competitors at the 2011 Summer Universiade
Athletes (track and field) at the 2009 Mediterranean Games
Mediterranean Games competitors for Italy